The Victoria Hall disaster occurred on 16 June 1883 at the Victoria Hall in Sunderland, England, when a stampede for free toys caused 183 children (aged between 3 and 14 years old) to be crushed to death due to compressive asphyxia.

Events

On 16 June 1883, a children's variety show was presented by travelling entertainers Mr. and Mrs. Fay.  The travelling magic show, consisting of a variety of conjuring tricks and illusions, passed without incident, except when a puff of smoke from one of the tricks "disagreed" with some of those in the front row, and caused a few children to be sick.

At the end of the show, an announcement was made that children with certain numbered tickets would be presented with a prize upon exit. At the same time, entertainers began distributing gifts from the stage to the children in the stalls. Worried about missing out on the treats, many of the estimated 1,100 children in the gallery surged toward the staircase leading downstairs. 

At the bottom of the staircase, the door opened inward and had been bolted so as to leave a gap only wide enough for one child to pass at a time. It is believed this was to ensure orderly checking of tickets. With few accompanying adults to maintain order, the children surged down the stairs toward the door. Those at the front became trapped and were crushed to death by the weight of the crowd behind them.

When the adults in the auditorium realised what was happening they rushed to the door, but they could not open it fully as the bolt was on the children's side. Caretaker Frederick Graham tried in vain to disentangle the pile-up, then ran up another staircase and diverted approximately 600 children to safety by another exit. Meanwhile, other adults pulled the children one by one through the narrow gap, before one man wrenched the door off its hinges.

In his 1894 account, survivor William Codling, Jr., described the crush and the realisation that people were dying:

Aftermath

The compressive asphyxia as a result of the stampede killed 183 children between 3 and 14 years of age.  Queen Victoria sent a message of condolence to the grieving families and contributed to the disaster fund.

Donations sent from all over Britain totalled £5,000 (equivalent to £ in ) and were used for the children's funerals and a memorial in Mowbray Park. The memorial, of a grieving mother holding a dead child, was later moved to Bishopwearmouth Cemetery where it gradually fell into disrepair and was vandalised. In 2002, the marble statue was restored at a cost of £63,000 and moved back to Mowbray Park with a protective canopy.

Newspaper reports at the time triggered a mood of national outrage and the resulting inquiry led to legislation that public entertainment venues be fitted with a minimum number of outward opening emergency exits, which led to the invention of "push bar" emergency doors. This law still remains in force. No one was prosecuted for the disaster and the person responsible for bolting the door was never identified. The Victoria Hall remained in use until 1941 when it was destroyed by a World War II parachute bomb.

Annual memorial services were set up in 2010 by the Sunderland Old Township Heritage Society.

Depiction in media 
The disaster inspired a poem by Scottish poet William McGonagall entitled "The Sunderland Calamity".

See also
Barnsley Public Hall disaster
Laurier Palace Theatre fire
Hillsborough disaster

References

1883 disasters in the United Kingdom
1883 in England
19th century in County Durham
Disasters in England
History of County Durham
History of Tyne and Wear
Human stampedes in the United Kingdom
Sunderland